Come On Come On is the fourth studio album by American country music artist Mary Chapin Carpenter. Seven of its tracks became Billboard Hot Country Singles hits in 1992, 1993, and 1994. They were, chronologically, "I Feel Lucky" at #4, "Not Too Much to Ask" (a duet with Joe Diffie) at #15, "Passionate Kisses" at #4, "The Hard Way" at #11, "The Bug" (a cover of a Dire Straits song) at #16, "He Thinks He'll Keep Her" at #2, and "I Take My Chances" also at #2. The album topped out at #6 on the Billboard Country Albums chart.

By 2017, the album had sold 2.9 million copies. It remains Carpenter's best-selling album.

Track listing
All songs written by Mary Chapin Carpenter except where noted.
"The Hard Way" – 4:22
"He Thinks He'll Keep Her" (Mary Chapin Carpenter, Don Schlitz) – 4:01
"Rhythm of the Blues" – 3:49
"I Feel Lucky" (Carpenter, Schlitz) – 3:31 (1993 Grammy Award for Best Female Country Vocal Performance)
"The Bug" (Mark Knopfler) – 3:47
"Not Too Much to Ask" (duet with Joe Diffie) (Carpenter, Schlitz) – 3:23
"Passionate Kisses" (Lucinda Williams) – 3:23 (1994 Grammy Award for Best Female Country Vocal Performance)
"Only a Dream" – 5:34
"I Am a Town" – 5:06
"Walking Through Fire" – 4:04
"I Take My Chances" (Carpenter, Schlitz) – 3:45
"Come On Come On" – 4:51

Production
Produced by Mary Chapin Carpenter and John Jennings except "The Bug", which was produced by Mary Chapin Carpenter, John Jennings, and Steve Buckingham.
Recorded and mixed by Bob Dawson and Marshall Morgan
Engineered by Toby Seay

Personnel
Adapted from Come On Come On liner notes.
J. T. Brown – bass guitar (4, 5), background vocals (4)
Mary Chapin Carpenter – acoustic guitar (1-3, 7, 9, 11, 12), vocals
Jon Carroll – piano (4, 6, 11), synthesizer (1), background vocals (4)
Rosanne Cash – background vocals (3)
Shawn Colvin – background vocals (1, 7, 12)
Denny Dadmun-Bixby – bass guitar (1, 11)
Joe Diffie – duet vocals (6)
Jerry Douglas – Dobro (6)
Paul Franklin – pedal steel guitar (5, 6), Pedabro (5)
Indigo Girls (Amy Ray and Emily Saliers) – background vocals (1, 10)
Bob Glaub – bass guitar (2, 7, 10)
John Barlow Jarvis – piano (9)
John Jennings – electric guitar (1, 2, 4-6, 11), acoustic guitar (3-6, 10, 12), bass guitar (3, 6, 12), percussion (3), programming (3), background vocals (1-5, 10-12)
John Jorgenson – electric guitar (2, 7, 10)
Robbie Magruder – drums (1, 4-6, 11)
Mike McAdam – electric guitar (4-6), tremolo guitar (6)
Edgar Meyer – double bass (9)
Andy Newmark – drums (2, 7, 10)
Matt Rollings – piano (1-3, 7, 8, 10, 12)
Benmont Tench – Hammond organ (2, 3, 10, 11)

Chart performance

Weekly charts

Year-end charts

Singles 
Billboard

References

1992 albums
Mary Chapin Carpenter albums
Albums produced by Steve Buckingham (record producer)
Columbia Records albums